Singles is a box set by the American rock band Nirvana, released in Europe in December 1995.

Background

The box set was produced in response to unofficial versions of it that had been released previously.

Content

The box set contains all six CD singles from the band's two Geffen Records-released studio albums, Nevermind, released in September 1991, and In Utero, released in September 1993. It includes "Smells Like Teen Spirit", "Come as You Are", "Lithium" and "In Bloom", released from 1991 to 1992 to promote Nevermind, and "Heart-Shaped Box" and the double A-side "All Apologies"/"Rape Me", released in 1993 to promote In Utero. It does not include the planned third In Utero single, "Pennyroyal Tea", which was canceled after the death of vocalist and guitarist Kurt Cobain in April 1994.

Although released in Europe, the Nevermind singles are the American versions, with the "Smells Like Teen Spirit" single lacking the studio version of "Drain You," and the "Lithium" single lacking the band's cover of the Wipers song "D-7," both of which appeared on the European versions of those singles. "In Bloom" and the two In Utero singles were not released in the US.

All singles appear in slimline  jewel cases.

Track listing
All written by Kurt Cobain, except when noted.

CD1: "Smells Like Teen Spirit"
"Smells Like Teen Spirit" (edit) (Cobain/Grohl/Novoselic) – 4:39
"Even in His Youth" – 3:06
"Aneurysm" (Cobain/Grohl/Novoselic) – 4:46

CD2: "Come as You Are"
"Come as You Are" – 4:39
"Endless, Nameless" – 6:43
"School" [live, Paramount Theatre, Seattle, Washington; October 31, 1991] – 4:18
"Drain You" [live, Paramount Theatre, Seattle, Washington; October 31, 1991] – 5:01

CD3: "In Bloom"
"In Bloom" – 4:14
"Sliver" [live, Del Mar Fairgrounds, Del Mar, California; December 28, 1991] – 2:15
"Polly" [live, Del Mar Fairgrounds, Del Mar, California; December 28, 1991] – 3:00

CD4: "Lithium"
"Lithium" – 5:02
"Been a Son" [live, Paramount Theatre, Seattle, Washington; October 31, 1991] – 2:02
"Curmudgeon" – 1:31

CD5: "Heart-Shaped Box"
"Heart-Shaped Box" – 4:38
"Milk It" – 3:54
"Marigold" (Grohl) – 2:34

CD6: "All Apologies/Rape Me"
"All Apologies" – 3:47
"Rape Me" – 2:51
"Moist Vagina" – 3:59

Chart performance

Despite being a box set of six separate CD singles the release was eligible to chart on the Danish Singles Chart, remaining in the Top 20 for 11 weeks and peaking at number 5. The release was also eligible to chart on the French Singles Chart, remaining on the chart for 8 weeks and peaking at number 17.

Charts
Singles was eligible to chart on the singles chart in Denmark and France, and on the albums chart in the United Kingdom.

Singles charts

Album charts

References

Compilation albums published posthumously
Nirvana (band) compilation albums
1995 compilation albums
Geffen Records compilation albums